Sacrifist is the second album by Bill Laswell's experimental music project Praxis, released in 1993 on Laswell's label Subharmonic. Originally, the album was intended to be a Rammellzee project, but soon was converted into the second Praxis album, after suggestions made by John Zorn.

The line-up features the core Praxis trio of Laswell, guitarist Buckethead and drummer Brain. Additionally, Bootsy Collins and Bernie Worrell (of Parliament-Funkadelic), both also featured on the debut album, return for one lengthy track each: "Deathstar" includes Collins' "free-form bass explorations" and "Crossing" features Worrell's "psychedelic improvisation on a distorted Hammond organ". Vocals are handled by Mick Harris from Napalm Death and Scorn as well as Yamatsuka Eye from Boredoms. Saxophonist John Zorn and the members of dub band Blind Idiot God are also featured.

The music on the album is a mix of noisy speed/thrash metal with short interludes of dub music and hip-hop and samples of other media, namely the 1989 Japanese horror film Tetsuo: The Iron Man.

Different pressings
Some CD pressings of the album have all the songs as one track in a somewhat lower sound quality and parts of the last track are missing. This reissue can be easily identified by looking at the back cover, which has the name of producer John T. Matarazzo listed.

Track listing

Personnel
Praxis:
Buckethead - guitar
Brain - drums
Bootsy Collins - bass and vocals
Ted Epstein - drums
Yamatsuka Eye - vocals
Mick Harris - vocals
Andy Hawkins - guitar
Gabriel Katz - bass
Bill Laswell - bass
Bernie Worrell - keyboards
John Zorn - saxophone

References

1994 albums
Praxis (band) albums
Subharmonic (record label) albums